Gyangze or Gyantse may refer to:

Gyangzê County, a county in Tibet
Gyangzê Town, a town in Tibet
Gyantse Dzong, a fortress above the town of Gyantse, Tibet